The  (SV), in English, German Shepherd Association, is a breed club founded in Germany in 1899 by Max von Stephanitz and his colleague, Arthur Meyer, which set forward the standards of the German Shepherd dog breed.

History 
On the sidelines of a dog show in Karlsruhe in April 1899, Max von Stephanitz, Arthur Meyer, and a number of others decided to form a club for the German Shepherd Dog.

Von Stephanitz strongly believed that the German Shepherd Dogs' working ability was of the utmost importance and that aesthetics were less important. Thus, in order to avoid the arguments that led to the disestablishment of an earlier club, the Phylax Society, the SV's first breed standard stipulated, "A pleasing appearance is desirable, but it cannot put the dog's working ability into question."

Presidents of the SV 
The current and former presidents of the SV are:
 1899-1935: Captain Max von Stephanitz
 1935-1945: Dr Kurt Roesebeck
 1945-1956: Mr Caspar Katzmair
 1956-1971: Dr Werner Funk
 1971-1982: Dr Christoph Rummel
 1982-1994: Mr Hermann Martin
 1994–2002: Mr Peter Meßler
 2002–2015: Wolfgang Henke
 2015- : Heinrich Meßler

References

External links 
Verein für Deutsche Schäferhunde (SV)
Weltunion der Schaferhundvereine (WUSV)

Breeder organizations
German shepherds
History of the German Shepherd Dog